Sonnet 114 is one of 154 sonnets written by the English playwright and poet William Shakespeare. It is a member of the Fair Youth sequence, in which the poet expresses his love towards a young man.

Synopsis
Is the poet's mind flattered, like a king, by the youth's presence, or is it simply a truth that is being told by his eyes that ugly things are made beautiful by the mental image of the youth? Surely it must be flattery, that he consumes like a king. He knows he enjoys it even if it's poisonous. Even if it is, it's less of a sin because his eye is motivated by love.

Structure 
Sonnet 114 is an English or Shakespearean sonnet. The English sonnet has three quatrains, followed by a final rhyming couplet. It follows the typical rhyme scheme of the form ABAB CDCD EFEF GG and is composed in iambic pentameter, a type of poetic metre based on five pairs of metrically weak/strong syllabic positions. The 7th line exemplifies a regular iambic pentameter:

  ×/ ×   /   ×  /  ×  /  ×    / 
Creating every bad a perfect best, (114.7)

Lines 6, 8, 9, and 11 have a final extrametrical syllable or feminine ending:

 ×     / × /   ×   ×     /    /    × / (×) 
Such cherubins as your sweet self resemble, (114.6)
/ = ictus, a metrically strong syllabic position. × = nonictus. (×) = extrametrical syllable.

Line 6 exhibits another metrical variation, the rightward movement of the third ictus (resulting in a four-position figure, × × / /, sometimes referred to as a minor ionic). Minor ionics may potentially be found in lines 5 and 10. Another metrical variation, a mid-line reversal, is found in line 4:

×     /   ×    /    /     ×    ×  /   × / 
And that your love taught it this alchemy, (114.4)

An initial reversal is potentially present in line 2.

The meter demands a few variant pronunciations: Line 1's "being" functions as one syllable, and line 9's "flattery" as two.

Notes

References

British poems
Sonnets by William Shakespeare